Gustaf Nordén (October 23, 1884 – December 14, 1947) was a Swedish track and field athlete who competed in the 1912 Summer Olympics. In 1912 he finished tenth in the triple jump competition.

References

External links
profile 

1884 births
1947 deaths
Swedish male triple jumpers
Olympic athletes of Sweden
Athletes (track and field) at the 1912 Summer Olympics